The Yakovlev Yak-33 was a vertical takeoff and landing supersonic multi-purpose aircraft family, studied in the early 1960s, with variants of a basic design used to fulfill different roles, in a similar fashion to the Yak-25, Yak-27, Yak-28 family.

Several configurations were studied including canard and tailless deltas, however matching supersonic performance with VTOL ability seriously compromised the design's ability to carry out its primary missions.

Specifications (Yak-33 estimated)

References

Further reading

1960s Soviet fighter aircraft
1960s Soviet bomber aircraft
1960s Soviet military reconnaissance aircraft
VTOL aircraft
Yak-033
Abandoned military aircraft projects of the Soviet Union